The Honda Collection Hall is a transport museum housing a collection of Honda consumer- and racing-oriented artifacts. It is on the grounds of the Twin Ring Motegi race track located at Motegi, Tochigi, Japan. It opened in 1998. It is operated by Honda subsidiary Mobilityland.

Collection
All items in the collection are maintained in running order; the museum posts times when visitors can see the display models started. The museum contains approximately 350 automobiles, motorcycles and power products. This is a sampling of items that press reports found particularly noteworthy.

Pre-20th century
Daimler Reitwagen (replica)

20th century
 Honda Dream A — first product to carry the Honda name in 1947
 Honda RC142 — first Honda MotoGP point by Naomi Taniguchi in 1959
 2RC143 — Honda's first Isle of Man TT win in 1961
 T360 pickup truck — Honda's first four-wheel vehicle in 1963
 RA272 — Honda's first Formula One winner in 1965
 NR500 — oval-pistoned race motorcycle and Honda's first V-4 in 1979

21st century
 ASIMO and Honda's E series/P series prototype humanoid robots
 Caixa folding electric scooter

References

External links

Honda Collection Hall from Twin Ring Motegi 
Google Virtual Gallery Tour

Collection Hall
Motorcycle museums
Automobile museums in Japan
Industry museums in Japan
Museums in Tochigi Prefecture
Museums established in 1998
1998 establishments in Japan
Motegi, Tochigi